General elections were held in Azad Kashmir in 1991 to elect the members of fifth assembly of Azad Kashmir.

References

Elections in Azad Kashmir
1991 elections in Pakistan